Crossplay Love: Otaku x Punk, known in Japan as Josou-shite Mendokusai Koto ni Natteru Nekura to Yankee no Ryou Kataomoi and abbreviated Nekuyan, is a Japanese romantic comedy manga series created by Toru, originally released independently since April 18, 2018, and published by Mag Garden on MAGXIV since September 10, 2018. Mag Garden has also collected the manga in ten tankōbon volumes, which are released in English by Seven Seas Entertainment since September 2022.

The story follows Yuuma Hanae and Shuumei Satogiri, two young men who fall in love with each other while cross-dressing, both believing the other to be a woman. Following this, both try to keep the other from learning the truth. The series was well received by readers and critics for its comedic and suspenseful writing, and was nominated for the Next Manga Award in 2019 and the Denshi Comic Awards in 2020.

Premise
Yuuma Hanae, a gloomy student, works at the Taishō era-themed maid café Roman as a waitress, where he as part of his job cross-dresses in a kimono-inspired dress and goes by the feminine name Hana. Shuumei Satogiri, a delinquent at the same school, mistakes Yuuma for a woman and falls in love with him, but is afraid of approaching him, so he disguises himself as a woman, and becomes a regular at Roman as his female alter ego Mei.

Yuuma does not realize that Shuumei is a man, and falls in love with him, too – but since Yuuma dislikes delinquents and Shuumei dislikes gloomy people, both must keep the other from learning the truth of who they are. Other characters include Shuumei's childhood friend Yuzuru Tanigami, who sees through Yuuma's and Shuumei's disguises but pretends not to.

Production and release
The series is created by Toru, who writes the story with a combination of misunderstanding-based comedy, romance, and suspense. It was originally released independently through their Twitter account starting on April 18, 2018; since September 10, 2018, it is serialized by Mag Garden on their digital platform MAGXIV. Mag Garden has published collected tankōbon volumes of the series in Japanese since February 9, 2019 under its imprint Blade Comics and has released ten volumes as of February 9, 2023. Mag Garden has also released Crossplay Love merchandise including art prints and badges.

The series has since been translated into other languages: Kazé began publishing the tankōbon volumes in German in April 2022, and Seven Seas Entertainment in English beginning in September 2022. Piccoma has published the series in French since September 2022 as a digital-only release.

Volumes

Chapters not in collected volumes
These chapters have as of February 9, 2023, not been published in collected volumes:

Reception
Crossplay Love was nominated for the 2019 Next Manga Award and the 2020 , the latter of which called it a great series with an intriguing premise. The manga's web edition had been viewed 15 million times as of February 2019, and was popular with readers.  and Splashcomics both considered it a good cross-dressing comedy for fans of the genre, recommending it to readers who have enjoyed similar manga like Mikiyo Tsuda's Princess Princess. Multiversity Comics listed it as one of their top manga of August 2022 for its "multi-layered" exploration of sexuality and gender, which they considered earnest while avoiding becoming too serious.

The writing was generally well received, with Animania, and Splashcomics commending it for its comedic and "mind-boggling set-up" and quirky scenarios, and NLab finding it cute. Koneko appreciated the comedy of the hidden boys' love scenario; Animania also highlighted the comedic moments, which they thought would appeal to cross-dressing and gender-bending fans, but found the timing off for the slapstick-based gags. Reviewing the first volume, they also criticized the series for not living up to the premise's potential to the same level as similar series like Wakana Yanai's Cinderella Closet, although Splashcomics found the story to develop well as it continued, with increasing amounts of chaotic and wacky comedy and suspense as more characters get involved and the two leads try to avoid getting found out. NLab, too, enjoyed the suspenseful developments, such as when the leads meet while only one is disguised as their female alter ego.

Critics also liked Toru's art, with Splashcomics calling it well staged, and Animania calling it a stylish, appealing and frantic shōjo-like style, although at times a bit too visually cluttered. They also liked the character designs, which they thought suited each character well, such as Yuuma's "gorgeous" dresses and Shuumei's sporty outfits, although Koneko considered the protagonists' female personas to be better drawn than their regular selves.

Notes

References

External links
  
 

2018 webcomic debuts
Cross-dressing in anime and manga
Japanese comedy webcomics
LGBT in anime and manga
Mag Garden manga
Romantic comedy anime and manga
Seven Seas Entertainment titles
Webcomics in print